Ginanjar Wahyu Ramadhani (born 20 November 2003) is an Indonesian professional footballer who plays as a midfielder or forward for Liga 1 club Persija Jakarta and the Indonesia national under-20 team.

Club career

Persija Jakarta
After starting his career at Inspire Academy and joined Bhayangkara youth team for 6 months, he joined Persija Jakarta on 1 January 2022, started from the youth team and was promoted to the senior squad on 1 July 2022. On 23 July 2022, Ginanjar made his first-team debut by being starting player in a 1–0 loss match against Bali United at Kapten I Wayan Dipta Stadium.

On 8 January 2023, Ginanjar scored his first league goal for Persija against PSS Sleman as his team won 2–0.

International career
On 14 September 2022, Ginanjar made his debut for Indonesia U-20 national team against Timor-Leste U-20, in a 4–0 win in the 2023 AFC U-20 Asian Cup qualification. In October 2022, it was reported that Ginanjar received a call-up from the Indonesia U-20 for a training camp, in Turkey and Spain.

Career statistics

Club

Notes

References

External links
 Ginanjar Wahyu at Soccerway

2003 births
Living people
Sportspeople from Jakarta
Indonesian footballers
Persija Jakarta players
Liga 1 (Indonesia) players
Indonesia youth international footballers
Association football midfielders